Mustafa Kardeen (Arabic:مصطفى كردين) (born 17 March 1988) is a Qatari footballer. He currently plays as a goalkeeper for Al-Kharaitiyat .

Career
He formerly played for Umm Salal, and Al-Kharaitiyat .

External links

References

Living people
1988 births
Qatari footballers
Umm Salal SC players
Al Kharaitiyat SC players
Qatar Stars League players
Qatari Second Division players
Association football goalkeepers
Place of birth missing (living people)